Zhang Hongnian (born December 1931) is a Chinese translator who had been honored by the Iranian Government.

Zhang is one of the foremost translators of Persian Literature. For his contributions to the introduction of Persian Literature to foreign readers, he was honored with the International Persian Literature Award in 1992, 6th Literature and Art Award in 1998 and the Outstanding Award for Chinese and Persian Culture Exchange in 2000.

Biography
Zhang was born in Yongqing County, Hebei in December 1931.

Zhang graduated from Peking University in 1960, where he majored in Russian and Persian.

In 1986, Zhang studied in Iran.

Works
 History of Persian Literature
 Shahnameh (Ferdowsi)
 Gulistan of Sa'di (Saadi Shirazi)
 Rubaiyat of Omar Khayyam (Omar Khayyám)


Awards
 Tehran University – International Persian Literature Award (1992)
 Afshar Foundation – 6th Literature and Art Award (1998)
 Iranian President Mohammad Khatami awarded him the Outstanding Award for Chinese and Persian Culture Exchange (2000)
 Chinese Translation Association – Competent Translator (2004)

References

1931 births
Writers from Hebei
Peking University alumni
People's Republic of China translators
Living people
Translators from Persian
20th-century Chinese translators
21st-century Chinese translators
People from Langfang